Nappanee is a city in Elkhart and Kosciusko counties in the U.S. state of Indiana. The population was 6,648 as of the 2010 U.S. Census and had grown to 6,913 by the 2020 U.S. Census. The name Nappanee probably means "flour" in Algonquian. The town has several tourist attractions: Amish Acres, Nappanee Raceway, The Arts & Crafts Festival, and the Apple Festival.

History
Several hundred years ago the Mound Builders built north of the marshes. Pottawatomi arrived in the area from near Green Bay, Wisconsin in the 1700s, partially displacing Miami inhabitants. The Pottawatomis had settlements on the Elkhart River at Elkhart, Goshen, and Waterford, and at Monoquet between Leesburg and Warsaw in what became Kosciusko County, Indiana. Thus, the Plymouth-Goshen Road near Nappanee probably follows the course of an old Indian Trail. The first white settlers came to the area In 1830, as various treaties and what Pottawatomi call the "Trail of Death" led to the relocation of Native Americans.

Railroad town

By 1870, seven farms had been established and forty people were settled around Nappanee. Locke Township had been founded in 1836 and named after Samuel Lockwood, and by 1863 a settlement called Wisler Town existed, but the actual platting of the village of Locke Town, approximately six miles from Nappanee, took place in December 1867. It would receive its last addition in 1874, the year that Nappanee was platted (on December 12, 1874).

The B&O Railroad sought a route westward from Sandusky, Ohio to the booming inland port of Chicago, Illinois in 1872. While the land around what became Nappanee and nearby Bremen was flat, permitting a straight crossing from Walkerton, it was also marshy, which led to engineering challenges. The section through Nappanee was finally completed as a single track in the late summer of 1874 and replaced by steel rails in 1882. Farmers sold the railroad land so that its tracks would run right next to Nappanee on its route to Chicago, although the railroad was unable to acquire the five acres needed to build a side track to the existing town of Locke. Nonetheless, on December 6, 1874, about three weeks after the railroad reached the outskirts of Chicago, it commenced service to what it first called Locke's Station. By the month's end, Daniel Metzler, Henry Stahly, and John Culp Jr. had platted the town of Nappanee; Culp gave the railroad three acres for a station and Metzler two acres. By 1875, trains arrived almost daily at the new depot and discharged freight and passengers. The Eby brothers of Locke said they suggested the name because they came from Napanee, Ontario; one of the Metzlers said their father selected the name in part because of its native American connotations. Over time the B&O Railroad eventually became CSX.

Development

The town's first industry was a sawmill, and later additions were box-making, charcoal, and furniture businesses. The first brickyard (using local resources) was established before 1879. The first canning company was established in 1894, and a hemp factory was built by 1913. The hemp factory never reached full capacity, and was burned down in 1920, not rebuilt. Mobile home construction had started in Elkhart and Goshen by World War II, and the Walco and Franklin Coach Company were built in Nappanee after the war. Once the land was cleared, corn and wheat were planted, and agriculture has long been important in the area. By the early 20th century, onions had become a major crop (including an autumn festival), and other farmer-entrepreneurs grew hemp, spearmint and peppermint.

Nappanee was governed as a township from 1874 until 1889 when it incorporated as a town (then electing a town marshal and establishing a fire company and soon a waterworks). The town library was started as a ladies' subscription service in 1895 and became a public library in 1925 after sufficient building funds were amassed to purchase an existing house, although a dedicated building wasn't opened until 1937. In 1895, some tried to establish a college in Nappanee, but unlike various fellowships and fraternal and literary societies, the proposal never was implemented. In 1925 Nappanee incorporated as a city.
Early in the 20th century, various Nappanee natives became noted cartoonists, including Merrill Blosser, Max Gwin, Bill Holman, Fred Neher and Henry Maust, and political cartoonist Francis (Mike) Parks was educated in Nappanee before working for New York, Omaha and San Francisco newspapers. A marker outside the public library notes Nappanee's cartooning history.
The Frank and Katharine Coppes House, Downtown Nappanee Historic District, Arthur Miller House, Nappanee Eastside Historic District, Nappanee West Park and Pavilion, and Stahly-Nissley-Kuhns Farm are listed on the National Register of Historic Places.

A tornado touched down in Nappanee around 10:30 PM on 18 October 2007, injuring at least five people and damaging 200 to 250 buildings, half of them severely. The tornado was classified as an EF3. The damage included three recreational vehicles factories that are among the community's largest employers: Fairmont Homes, Franklin Coach, and Gulf Stream Coach.

Amish migration to Nappanee
The religious group that broke off of the Mennonites was formed in 1525 in Switzerland as part of the Radical Reformation and quickly spread to Germany and the Netherlands. As a more radical branch of the wider Protestant Reformation against Catholic practices, the Mennonites were vigorously persecuted by religious and worldly authorities. During the last decade of the 17th century a group from the Mennonites led by Jakob Ammann separated to form the Amish group which was named after its leader.

During the 18th century, the Amish were attracted to the promise of religious freedom in William Penn's colony and thus settled in Pennsylvania. Amish then migrated to Middlebury in 1841 coming from Holmes County, Ohio, where they had migrated to from Pennsylvania, starting in 1809. Nappanee's Amish originate from the early Amish immigrants from southwest Germany, notably the Palatinate, to Pennsylvania in the middle of the 18th century.

Amish families who became Old Order Amish in the second half of the 19th century first arrived in southwest Elkhart County in the early 1840s, and various other religious conservative denominations followed them. The First Mennonite Church in the area was founded in 1854, but members worshiped in homes, then built a schoolhouse in 1867 and also used it for services for several years (as did other denominations with their permission).

The first permanent building was erected in 1878, two years after the United Brethren Church moved from the schoolhouse into its own building (only to sell it and build a new building in 1888 and remodel it in 1928). Nappanee is still surrounded by family farms of conservative Anabaptists, including the Amish, Mennonites, and the Schwarzenau Brethren.

National Register of Historic Places
Arthur Miller House
Frank and Katharine Coppes House
Downtown Nappanee Historic District
Nappanee Eastside Historic District
Nappanee West Park and Pavilion
Stahly–Nissley–Kuhns Farm

Geography

Nappanee is now surrounded by fertile farmland as the headwaters of the Wabash River in northern Indiana, but initially was one of the least desirable areas of what became Elkhart County, due to dense woods and widespread swamps, particularly tamarack marshes. Actually, it drains into two watersheds—precipitation south of what became Market Street drains into the Wabash River, thence to the Ohio River, Mississippi River, and ultimately the Gulf of Mexico. Precipitation north of Market Street drains into the Great Lakes, and ultimately the St. Lawrence River and the Atlantic Ocean.

Government
Mayor Phil Jenkins
Clerk-Treasurer Kathy Brown, Oversees city finances, including accounts payable, budget, and investments. Primary record-keeper for the city government.
Council
At Large Jacob Dermott
District 1 Todd Nunemaker
District 2 Kim Ingle
District 3 Sam Beachy
District 4 Dana Hollar
City Court Judge Christopher Walter
Service to the City, 2010–present Judge (appointed by Gov. Mitch Daniels). Presides over city court and issues sentences and fines for infractions or misdemeanors

Demographics

2010 census
As of the census of 2010, there were 6,648 people, 2,545 households, and 1,792 families residing in the city. The racial makeup of the city was 94.8% White, 0.7% African American, 0.3% Native American, 0.2% Asian, 0.1% Pacific Islander, 2.4% from other races, and 1.5% from two or more races. Hispanic or Latino of any race were 6.2% of the population.

There were 2,545 households, of which 37.8% had children under the age of 18 living with them, 52.7% were married couples living together, 12.0% had a female householder with no husband present, 5.7% had a male householder with no wife present, and 29.6% were non-families. 24.6% of all households were made up of individuals, and 9.9% had someone living alone who was 65 years of age or older. The average household size was 2.60 and the average family size was 3.09.

The median age in the city was 34.8 years. 27.9% of residents were under the age of 18; 8.6% were between the ages of 18 and 24; 27.6% were from 25 to 44; 23.4% were from 45 to 64; and 12.5% were 65 years of age or older. The gender makeup of the city was 48.9% male and 51.1% female.

2000 census
As of the census of 2000, there were 6,710 people, 2,521 households, and 1,792 families residing in the city. The racial makeup of the city was 95.48% White, 0.28% African American, 0.22% Native American, 0.34% Asian, 2.52% from other races, and 1.15% from two or more races. Hispanic or Latino of any race were 4.98% of the population.

There were 2,521 households, out of which 39.2% had children under the age of 18 living with them, 57.1% were married couples living together, 9.3% had a female householder with no husband present, and 28.9% were non-families. 23.9% of all households were made up of individuals, and 8.6% had someone living alone who was 65 years of age or older. The average household size was 2.65 and the average family size was 3.15.

In the city the population was spread out, with 29.7% under the age of 18, 10.6% from 18 to 24, 30.9% from 25 to 44, 17.9% from 45 to 64, and 11.0% who were 65 years of age or older. The median age was 31 years. For every 100 females, there were 99.8 males. For every 100 females age 18 and over, there were 97.5 males.

The median income for a household in the city was $45,988, and the median income for a family was $53,329. Males had a median income of $36,200 versus $21,733 for females. The per capita income for the city was $19,229. About 4.5% of families and 4.6% of the population were below the poverty line, including 5.9% of those under age 18 and 8.4% of those age 65 or over.

Amish community
There is a large Amish community founded in 1842, centered around the Nappanee. It is the sixth largest of all Amish settlements with 5,910 people (in 43 congregations) in 2017.

Education
Wa-nee is the combination of Wakarusa, a neighboring town, and Nappanee area schools. Over 375 teachers and staff are employed with Wa-nee Community Schools. Throughout the state, Wa-nee is known for its strong academic, extracurricular, and athletic programs.

NorthWood High School-Recently given the Indiana Chamber of Commerce “Best Buy Schools” distinction for quality education with conscientious use of taxpayer dollars.
NorthWood Middle School and Wakarusa Elementary-are also part of the Wa-nee Community Schools, but are located in Wakarusa.
Nappanee Elementary-Located within Nappanee
Woodview Elementary-A mirror image to Wakarusa Elementary structurally. Sits on the outskirts of Nappanee.

The town has a free lending library, the Nappanee Public Library.

Transportation

Until train service ceased on March 7, 2005, Nappanee station was a stop on Amtrak's Three Rivers train with service to Chicago and New York.

Economy
Nappanee is a regional center for both the recreational vehicle manufacturing industry and the Amish craft and tourism industry. Many Amish and Mennonite families live in the area, often farming as well as working in the recreational vehicle industry or woodworking trade. Since the storms  and sluggish economy, Nappanee had experienced a high rate of job loss. It has since recovered. Since 2014, the town has been home to a major bus assembly plant owned by British maker Alexander Dennis.

Tourist attractions

Amish Acres
Amish Acres was founded by Richard Pletcher. It is a historic farm and heritage resort which embodies a preserved barn and Amish house that help to "Embrace the Pace" as Nappanee's slogan implies. Amish Acres celebrates the Amish and shows features of their lifestyle. Amish Acre's original preserved Round Barn was relocated to it current location, and within it was constructed a theater in order to present shows. In addition to viewing plays at Amish Acres, tourists can also experience authentic Amish-style cooking. Amish Acres offers other activities such as tours of an Amish house and a horse-drawn carriage ride. Amish Acres is home to Nappanee's Arts and Crafts Festival.

Festivals

The Nappanee Apple Festival
The Nappanee Apple Festival is held annually on the third week of September, lasting 3½ days. It consists of 100 craft booths, 50 commercial booths, 20 food vendors, two stages for entertainment, a large parade and an airplane flyover on Saturday morning. Nappanee annually bakes a seven-foot-wide apple pie that weighs 600 pounds. Every year an Apple Blossom Queen is chosen from NorthWood High School. The Nappanee Apple Festival attracted over 76,000 people in 2011 and is one of the largest festivals in the State of Indiana. Over 200 people from Nappanee volunteer to help with the Apple Festival each year. Other events include an apple peeling contest, 5K road run, half marathon, apple pie eating and apple peeling contests, goldfish races, wings & wheels show (cars and airplanes), tractor pull, farm tractor and antique farm equipment show, apple baking contest, kids and adult pedal pull contests, talent show, and a scholarship pageant.

Amish Acres Arts & Crafts Festival
Richard Pletcher, founder of the festival and Amish Acres, remains CEO and Jennifer Pletcher Wysong is the festival director. The festival and marketplace takes place around Amish Acre's pond. Amish Acres has received many awards, making its way onto The American Bus Association's list of TOP 100 Events in North America in 2012. This achievement was awarded four times in seven years. Readers of Sunshine Artist magazine rank the Art and Crafts Festival as the third-best Classic and Contemporary Craft Show in America. The Art festival was also listed at the number one in the category of "best attractions for group travel in Indiana" in Travel Trade Magazine. Senior Group Traveler selected the Arts and Craft Festival as one of only seventy "Editor's Choice of Outstanding Festivals and Major Events"; the Art and Craft Festival being the only one chosen from Indiana. Amish Acre's Art and Craft Festival attracts people from areas as far as Chicago, Indianapolis, Toledo, and Detroit. Amish Acre's grounds can only support up to 300 booths which consist of 250 different cities from 30 states.

Notable people

 Merrill Blosser, (Freckles and His Friends)
 David Crane (programmer), creator of Pitfall! and co-founder of Activision
 Vance George, conductor of the San Francisco Symphony Chorus from 1982 to 2006
 Bill Holman, (Smokey Stover)
 Fred Neher, (Life’s Like That)
 Bob Rensberger, (1921–2007), a professional basketball player for the Chicago Stags
 Diane Meyer Simon, environmental activist and former wife of Herbert Simon

Twin city
  Greater Napanee, Ontario

References

Sources
 They Called It Nappanee: A History 1874-1974 by James L Weygand. (Nappanee, Indiana, 1974)

External links
City of Nappanee, Indiana website
 Amish Acres Historic Farm and Heritage Resort - Listed in the National Register of Historic Places
 Nappanee Missionary Church - Largest church in the area
 Nappanee Amish community

Amish in Indiana
Cities in Elkhart County, Indiana
Cities in Kosciusko County, Indiana
Cities in Indiana